Olcott is a relatively fresh crater on the far side of the Moon. It was named after American astronomer William Tyler Olcott. It lies to the south-southeast of the craters Seyfert and Polzunov, and to the north of Kostinskiy.

This crater lacks any significant appearance of erosion from subsequent impacts, and its features are relatively well-defined. The rim edge is generally circular, with a slight outward bulge to the northeast and a larger bulge to the south. It has an outer rampart and some terraces and slumped edges along the inner wall. Several low ridges lie near the interior midpoint, with the western pair near the center and the eastern peaks offset towards the eastern rim.

The satellite craters Olcott M and Olcott L form an overlapping pair along the southern outer rampart of Olcott, with the smaller member of the pair Olcott L overlapping Olcott M. The satellite crater Olcott E is partly overlain by the eastern rim of Olcott.

Prior to naming in 1970 by the IAU, this crater was known as Crater 209.

Satellite craters

By convention these features are identified on lunar maps by placing the letter on the side of the crater midpoint that is closest to Olcott.

References

External links

Olcott at The Moon Wiki

Impact craters on the Moon